Domenico Sommaripa (d. 1466) was a Lord of Andros, first of a branch of the Sommaripa family known as Sommaripa of Andros.

Ancestry
He was a son of Crusino I Sommaripa, and wife.

Marriage and issue
He married Adriana Crispo, daughter of John II Crispo, twelfth Duke of the Archipelago, and wife Nobil Donna Francesca Morosini, Patrizia Veneta, and had three sons : 
 Giovanni Sommaripa, lord of Andros from 1466, killed around 1468 in a Turkish attack on Andros
 Crusino II Sommaripa, lord of Andros from 1468 to his death around 1500
 Francesco Sommaripa, lord of Andros in 1506 but dispossessed after a few months

He was succeeded by his eldest son Giovanni.

References

1466 deaths
Domenico
Domenico
Year of birth unknown
15th-century Italian nobility